Noagaon Union is a union, the smallest administrative body of Bangladesh, located in Sonargaon Upazila, Narayanganj District, Bangladesh. The total population as of 2001 was 18,258.

References

Unions of Sonargaon Upazila